Contrary to the methods used by the Reich Air Ministry (RLM) for the allocation of aircraft designations, the designers and manufacturers of sailplanes and gliders in Germany enjoyed the freedom of choosing their own designations for their products up until 1945.

Thus a bird name like Habicht could be used, or a number combined with two or more letters, stemming from the designer's or factory's name, such as DFS, RRG or Göppingen. The RLM only assigned them for every design a separate number, which obviously served the same purposes as that used with aircraft, namely to provide a common basis for an exchange of drawings in the event of an intended production under license by other firms or by clubs, or even single persons and to secure the provision of spare parts. A rigid system of rules for the form and order of drawings was applied.

Whereas RLM aircraft designations were prefixed by the number 8, glider references began with "108-", for example 108-53 referred to the DFS Habicht.

In a relaxation of the regulations regarding allocation of aircraft designations, the designers and manufacturers of sailplanes and gliders in Germany enjoyed the freedom of choosing their own designations for their products up until 1945, but some of the more common aircraft were issued RLM designations in the 108 series.

108-10Schneider Grunau 9 -  primary glider (1929)

108-11RRG Zögling 33 -  primary glider (1933)

108-14DFS Schulgleiter SG.38 -  standard basic gliding trainer (1938)

108-15RRG Zögling 12m -  primary glider (1934)

108-16Weber EW-2 -  four-seat high-performance sailplane

108-21Hirth Hi 21 -  two-seat sailplane

108-22Hirth Hi-20 MoSe -  (for Motorsegler = motor glider); motorized glider

108-29Fliege IIa -  primary glider (1935)

108-30DFS Kranich II -  two-seat sailplane (1935)

108-47Schleicher / Jacobs Rhönadler -  single-seat high-performance sailplane (1932)

108-49Schneider / DFS Grunau Baby II -  glider (1932)

108-50Jacobs Rhönbussard -  single-seat high-performance sailplane (1933)

108-51Jacobs / Schweyer / DFS Rhönsperber -  single-seat high-performance sailplane (1935)

108-53DFS Habicht -  single-seat acrobatics sailplane (1936)

108-56Dittmar Condor II -  single-seat high-performance sailplane (1935)

108-58Hirth Göppingen Gö 1 Wolf -  sailplane (1935)

108-60Jacobs / DFS Reiher -  single-seat high-performance sailplane (1937)

108-61Hütter / Schempp-Hirth Göppingen Gö 4 -  two-seat sailplane (1937)

108-64Schwarzwald-Flugzeugbau Donaueschingen Ibis

108-65Dittmar Condor III -  single-seat high-performance sailplane (1938)

108-66Schneider Grunau Baby III -  sailplane (1938)

108-67Hütter Hü 17 - sailplane (1937)

Gliders with unknown or not issued RLM designator
Akaflieg Darmstadt D28b Windspiel
Akaflieg Darmstadt D-30 Cirrus
Akaflieg Darmstadt D31
Akaflieg München Mü10 Milan
Blessing Kolibri-B
DFS Fafnir II
DFS Präsident
FAG Chemnitz C 11
FAG Esslingen E 3
FV Aachen FVA 11 Eifel
FV Aachen FVA 9
Akaflieg Berlin B 5
Akaflieg Berlin B 6
Akaflieg Berlin B 8
Akaflieg Hannover AFH 4
Akaflieg Stuttgart FS-16
Akaflieg Stuttgart FS-18
Grunau 7 Moazagotl
Grunau 8
Grunau Commodore
Gumpert Schwalbe II
Horten H.II
Horten H.III
Hütter Hü 28
Raab R2

After the Second World War, gliding was prohibited in Germany, but when the sport began again in 1951, glider types were allocated a Geräte-Nummer (Type Approval number).
New designs were given numbers from 101, but the following older types used their RLM designation as the  Geräte-Nummer:

References 

Germany transport-related lists
World War II aircraft of Germany
Military of Nazi Germany
Germany